The following is a list of rock musicals organized chronologically by the start date of the original run. The author of the book, lyrics, and music of each piece is also noted. 

1966 On the Flip Side on ABC Stage 67 by Burt Bacharach and Hal David
1966 The Golden Screw by Tom Sankey
1967 Hair written by James Rado, Gerome Ragni and Galt MacDermot.
1968 Your Own Thing by Hal Hester and Danny Apolinar
1969 Salvation by Peter Link and C.C. Courtney
1970 Jesus Christ Superstar by Tim Rice and Andrew Lloyd Webber
1970 The Survival of St. Joan by James Lineberger and Hank & Gary Ruffin
1971 Godspell by Stephen Schwartz and John-Michael Tebelak.
1971 Soon by Joseph M. Kookolis and Scott Fagan
1971 Two Gentlemen of Verona by John Guare, Mel Shapiro and Galt MacDermot
1972 Grease by Jim Jacobs and Warren Casey
1972 Dude by Galt MacDermot 
1972 Pippin by Stephen Schwartz, Roger O. Hirson and Bob Fosse
1973 The Rocky Horror Show by Richard O'Brien
1973 La Révolution Française by Claude-Michel Schönberg and Raymond Jeannot, book by Alain Boublil and Jean-Max Rivière
1973 An Imaginary Report on an American Rock Festival, book by Tibor Déry and music by Locomotiv GT
1974 Phantom of the Paradise by Brian De Palma and Paul Williams
1975 The Lieutenant by Gene Curty, Nitra Scharfman and Chuck Strand
1975 The Wiz by Charlie Smalls
1976 Evita by Tim Rice and Andrew Lloyd Webber
1976 Rockabye Hamlet by Cliff Jones
1978 Jeff Wayne's Musical Version of The War of the Worlds by Jeff Wayne
1978 Working, book by Stephen Schwartz and Nina Faso, music and lyrics by Schwartz, Craig Carnelia, Micki Grant, James Taylor and others
1979 Pink Floyd – The Wall written by Roger Waters, based on Pink Floyd's album, The Wall (1979), which was also mostly written by Waters
1979 Starmania by Michel Berger and Luc Plamondon
1979 In Trousers by William Finn
1981 Dreamgirls by Henry Krieger and Tom Eyen
1982 Little Shop of Horrors by Howard Ashman and Alan Menken
1983 The Human Comedy by Galt MacDermot
1983 István, a király (Stephen, the King) by János Bródy and Levente Szörényi
1984 Chess by Tim Rice, Björn Ulvaeus and Benny Andersson
1984 Starlight Express by Andrew Lloyd Webber
1986 Time by Dave Clark, David Soames and Jeff Daniels and additional songs by David Pomeranz
1988 Lāčplēsis (rock opera) by Zigmārs Liepiņš and Māra Zālīte
1989 Miss Saigon by Claude-Michel Schönberg and Alain Boublil, with Richard Maltby Jr., based on Giacomo Puccini's opera Madame Butterfly
1989 Return to the Forbidden Planet by Bubble Theatre Company
1989 The Iron Man by Pete Townshend (based on Ted Hughes' book The Iron Man).
1990 Paris by Jon English and David Mackay
1993 Randy Newman's Faust by Randy Newman
1993 The Who's Tommy by Pete Townshend, adaptation of The Who's rock opera
1994 The Scarlet Letter by Mark Governor based on the Nathaniel Hawthorne novel
1995 Buddy: The Buddy Holly Story songs by Buddy Holly and others
1995 An American Tragedy by Charles Strouse and Lee Adams
1996 Rent by Jonathan Larson
1997 Bat Boy by Laurence O'Keefe
1997 Tanz der Vampire by Jim Steinman (2002 as Dance of the Vampires)
1998 Hedwig and the Angry Inch, book by John Cameron Mitchell, music and lyrics by Stephen Trask
1998 Kat and the Kings by Taliep Petersen and David Kramer
1998 Quadrophenia by Pete Townshend, adaptation of The Who's rock opera
1998 The Capeman by Paul Simon
1999 Rasputin – Miracles Lie in the Eye of the Beholder by Michael Rapp
2000 Bare: A Pop Opera, book by Jon Hartmere Jr. and Damon Intrabartolo, lyrics by Hartmere and music by Intrabartolo
2000 Aida by Elton John and Tim Rice, based on Giuseppe Verdi's classical opera Aida
2000 Machina/The Machines of God and Machina II/The Friends & Enemies of Modern Music by The Smashing Pumpkins
2001 tick, tick... BOOM! by Jonathan Larson and David Auburn
2001 Peggy Sue Got Married by Bob Gaudio and Jerry Leichtling
2002 Movin' Out based on the music of Billy Joel
2002 Yoshimi Battles the Pink Robots, Pt. 1 by The Flaming Lips 
2002 Hairspray by Marc Shaiman and Scott Wittman 
2002 We Will Rock You featuring the music of Queen, book by Ben Elton
2003 Jerry Springer: The Opera by Stewart Lee and Richard Thomas, based on the television show The Jerry Springer Show
2003 Taboo by Boy George based on the New Romantic club scene in London in the 1980s.
2005 Bleach by Studio Pierrot based on Bleach by Tite Kubo
2005 Jersey Boys by Bob Gaudio and Bob Crewe
2005 Lestat  by Elton John and Bernie Taupin
2005 Rock of Ages featuring 1980s rock music, book by Chris D'Arienzo
2006 Tenacious D in The Pick of Destiny by Jack Black and Kyle Gass
2006 Spring Awakening by Duncan Sheik and Steven Sater (based on the play by Frank Wedekind).
2006 Passing Strange by Stew
2006 Tarzan (musical) by Phil Collins and David Henry Hwang
2006 High Fidelity (musical) by Tom Kitt and Amanda Green
2007 Legally Blonde by Laurence O'Keefe
2007 Moon Landing (music drama) by Stephen Edwards
2007 Sunshine on Leith, book by Stephen Greenhorn
2008 Lovelace: A Rock Musical by Anna Waronker and Charlotte Caffey
2008 Once Upon a Midnight by Tim Lucas and Alex Vickery-Howe
2008 Repo! The Genetic Opera by Darren Smith and Terrance Zdunich
2008 Rockford's Rock Opera by Steve Punt and Matthew Sweetapple
2008 Next to Normal by Tom Kitt and Brian Yorkey
2008 Razia's Shadow by Thomas and Paul Dutton
2009 Second Chance by Stéphane Prémont
2009 Memphis by Joe DiPietro and David Bryan
2009 The Toxic Avenger by Joe DiPietro and David Bryan
2010 Bloody Bloody Andrew Jackson, book by Alex Timbers and music by Michael Friedman.
2010 American Idiot by Green Day
2011 Spider-Man: Turn Off the Dark by Bono and The Edge
2012 The Devil's Carnival by Darren Smith and Terrance Zdunich
2012 Raiding the Rock Vault by John Payne and David Kershenbaum
2013 Metalocalypse: The Doomstar Requiem by Brendon Small
2013 King Kong by Marius de Vries and Eddie Perfect
2013 American Psycho by Duncan Sheik
2014 Heathers by Laurence O'Keefe and Kevin Murphy
2014 The Island of Doctor Moron by Chris Dockrill and Lyn Dockrill
2014 Rockville 2069: A Rock Musical by Johnny Ray and Bruno Paiola
2014 The Lightning Thief: The Percy Jackson Musical, book Joe Tracz and music and lyrics by Rob Rokicki
2015 School of Rock by Andrew Lloyd Webber, Glenn Slater and Julian Fellowes
2017  Bat Out of Hell by Jay Scheib and Jim Steinman
2017 The Band by Tim Firth and Take That
2017 Head over Heels by The Go-Go's
2018 Pretty Woman: The Musical by Bryan Adams
2018 Moulin Rouge by various, book by John Lohan
2018 All Out of Love by Air Supply
2019 Jagged Little Pill, book by Diablo Cody, lyrics by Alanis Morissette and music by Alanis Morissette and Glen Ballard.

See also
 Rock opera

Notes

References
 Everett, William A. and Paul R. Laird, The Cambridge Companion to the Musical (2002) Cambridge University Press, pp. 231–33 .
Musical theatre

Rock musicals
Rock musicals